Tipula luteipennis is a species of fly in the family Tipulidae. It is found in the  Palearctic .

References

External links
Images representing Tipula at BOLD

Tipulidae
Insects described in 1830
Nematoceran flies of Europe